The Yama is a river in Magadan Oblast, Russian Far East.

The R504 Kolyma Highway passes just west of the sources of the Yama. The name of the river is probably of Koryak origin.

Course 
The Yama has its source in the southwestern slopes of the Maymandzhin Range, at the confluence of rivers Maimandzha and Maimachan, near Atka and not far from the sources of north-heading Maltan. It flows in a roughly southeastern direction along its entire course. The last stretch of the Yama is in a marshy coastal area where it divides into multiple sleeves and where there are many small thermokarst lakes on the right bank. Finally it flows by Yamsk village into the Perevolochny estuary, separated by a landspit from Yam Bay, at the southwest end of the Shelikhov Gulf, Sea of Okhotsk.

Flora and fauna
Chosenia trees grow in the Yama floodplain by the banks of the river. 

The Yama river is a spawning ground for salmon species, including chum salmon, pink salmon and coho salmon. Arctic char and grayling are also found in the river.

See also
List of rivers of Russia

References

External links
Kolyma - Modern Guidebook to Magadan Oblast

Rivers of Magadan Oblast
Drainage basins of the Sea of Okhotsk